Rampage (real name Karen Lou "Kitty" Faulkner) is a fictional character in the DC Comics. The character first appeared in Superman comic books, and was later utilized in Starman. Rampage has a distinct appearance, with orange skin, a towering, muscular build, and a fiery red mohawk. Rampage's personality is (like her namesake) hot-tempered, aggressive and uninhibited, the complete opposite of her alter ego Kitty Faulkner.

Catherine Lough Haggquist portrayed the character in the second season of Superman & Lois.

Publication history
Rampage first appeared in Superman (vol. 2) #7 and was created by John Byrne.

Fictional character biography
Dr. Kitty Faulkner was working on a pollution-free energy source for a competition sponsored by the Daily Planet. Faulkner was exhibiting her installation when Dr. Thomas Moyers, a colleague arguing the potential dangers of the project to reporter Lois Lane, shut off the machine's safety systems. The resulting explosion transformed Faulkner into a huge, incredibly strong orange-skinned Amazon. Kitty had gained the ability to absorb solar energy through her skin, which made her grow continually taller and stronger. Disoriented and confused, she began to run amok through the streets of Metropolis. The Daily Planet, not knowing she was actually Kitty Faulkner, quickly dubbed her "Rampage". Superman stepped in, but showed restraint in subduing her, mistakenly thinking this was an alternate identity of Lois Lane. After Rampage was revealed to be Dr. Faulkner, Superman was able to drain off her excess solar energy and return Kitty to normal. 

Months later, Dr. Faulkner fell ill finding that her body now needed exposure to a certain amount of solar and cosmic energy or she would die. Dr. Moyers gave her a technological device in the form of a collar that would maintain the proper amount of exposure to keep her alive. Moyers also had a sinister motive - he transformed Faulkner into Rampage and had her sabotage the presidential campaign of Herbert Forrest. Forrest and Moyers were former friends, but Moyers had come to resent the candidate's corrupt morality. After several attacks Superman helped free Rampage from Moyers' control and sent him to jail. After modifying the regulator control collar, Kitty had her powers under control, and accepted a job at S.T.A.R. Labs.

Faulkner proved to be a talented administrator and earned a transfer to new S.T.A.R. Labs in Phoenix. Once there, she befriended the young superhero Starman AKA Will Payton. She helped him on several occasions as Rampage, and the two formed a relationship. Her part-time career of heroics and her romance came to an end when she was sent back to Metropolis to take part in the major re-organization of S.T.A.R. Labs necessitated by the destruction of the corporation's main laboratory. She supervised S.T.A.R. Labs' efforts to reignite the sun in the Final Night crisis.

When Kitty's new colleague Christine Bruckner framed her for embezzlement, Superman tried to speak in her defence, but found himself forced to pursue Rampage as she tore through the town of Leesburg trying to kill Christine for her betrayal, Superman limiting collateral damage while Supergirl - who had recently settled into Leesburg after adopting the civilian identity of Linda Danvers - tried to stop Rampage. When Superman allowed Rampage to attack Christine to end the pursuit, however, Rampage accepted that she didn't have it in her to commit murder, returning to Kitty while Supergirl forced Christine to confess what she had done.

Faulkner supervised the enhancement of the abilities of the hero Antaeus. In return, S.T.A.R. Labs gained valuable knowledge about the nature of genetically enhanced super-beings.

Since her return to Metropolis, it has been hinted that Kitty may have developed a crush on Parasite before his death.

She has received a promotion to director of Metropolis S.T.A.R. Labs.

Rampage recently resurfaced under the control of Starro.

Mon-El fights an out of control Rampage in Metropolis as his first test as the new guardian of the city. He carries her high into the air and carelessly drops her unaware that he might hurt her or someone else.

Powers and abilities
Kitty can absorb and store solar energy as sustenance. When her cells are metabolized, she grew in size with immense physical traits. Rampage is able to leap great distances by simulating the effects of flying. The more she feeds, the bigger she gets, but too much sunlight would overload her body. She wore a modified regulator collar that controls the proper amount of exposure for her to maintain human form. As Dr. Faulkner, she has scientific knowledge. But as Rampage, she became short-tempered, less inhibited, and always ready for the next adrenaline rush.

Other versions

Futures End 
An alternate version of Kitty Faulkner / Rampage appeared in the Futures End storyline. 5 years in the future of the New 52 continuity, Faulkner was an employee at LexCorp's genetic research laboratory, and met Fraudulent S.T.A.R. Labs scientist Ethan Boyer in a conference in Paris. She later worked on a failed experiment that mutated her into Rampage, leaving her in a perpetual berserker state while retaining some of her intelligence. With Lex Luthor unable to cure her, she broke Boyer out of jail, hoping his knowledge on genetics could cure her. Boyer, however, furthered her berserker rage instead, using her to distract the new Superman from him. Rampage then went on a rampage for the following weeks, before facing off against Superman, who was revealed during the fight to actually be Billy Batson. Rampage then throws Batson, but is caught by Stormguard, who defeats Rampage. Stomguard then promises to her that genecists will be able to help her once she is taken into custody.

In other media

Television
 Rampage appears in Justice League Unlimited, voiced by Susan Eisenberg in "Dead Reckoning" and by Lauren Tom in "The Great Brain Robbery", both of whom were uncredited. This version is a member of Gorilla Grodd's Secret Society who consciously and willingly takes part in criminal activities. Prior to and during the episode "Alive!", Lex Luthor takes control of the Society, but Grodd mounts a mutiny to retake command. Rampage sides with the latter, but is frozen by Killer Frost and killed by Darkseid along with Grodd's other loyalists.
 A character loosely based on Karen Faulkner named Kit Faulkner appears in the second season of Superman & Lois, portrayed by Catherine Lough Haggquist. This version is a geologist working for AmerTek Industries who oversees a mining operation at the Shuster Mine in Smallville and is connected to Ally Allston's Inverse Method cult. While attempting to keep people away from the Shuster Mine, Faulkner is killed by Bizarro.

Miscellaneous
Rampage appears in the Supergirl tie-in digital comic Adventures of Supergirl. This version is an alien named Caren Falqnerr who can take on human form.

References

Comics characters introduced in 1987
DC Comics characters with superhuman strength
DC Comics metahumans
DC Comics female superheroes
DC Comics female supervillains
DC Comics scientists
Fictional female scientists
Fictional characters with absorption or parasitic abilities
Fictional characters with superhuman durability or invulnerability
Characters created by John Byrne (comics)